Aaron Paul Dworkin (born September 11, 1970) is an American violinist and music educator.

Early life
Dworkin was born on September 11, 1970, in Monticello, New York, to Vaughn and Audeen Moore, but they were forced to give their son up for adoption. When he was two weeks old, Barry and Susan Dworkin, who both were New York City College professors, with a specialization in neuroscience, adopted him. Barry and Susan had another son as well. Susan had been an amateur violinist before Aaron's adoption, and when he was about five, she began to play again. She would play Bach pieces and gave him an interest in playing. In Manhattan, he took lessons from Vladimir Graffman. His biological mother is of Irish descent and his biological father is African-American, while his adoptive family is Jewish.

At age 10, his parents moved the family from Manhattan to Hershey, Pennsylvania, because his parents got jobs at the Hershey Medical Center.

He attended the Peabody Institute and Philadelphia's New School of Music. By his teens, he was performing regularly with the Hershey Youth Orchestra and the Harrisburg Youth Symphony. For his junior and senior year of high school, he attended the Interlochen Arts Academy, after his parents convinced him he needed to change. He had been unhappy about attending his other high school due to some prejudice based on his race.

College career
Dworkin enrolled at Penn State where he was concertmaster for the Penn State Philharmonic Orchestra. He was enrolled as a business major though, and he withdrew without earning a degree because of financial reasons.

He then decided to move to Michigan. He worked until he obtained enough funds to attend the University of Michigan. He graduated from the University of Michigan School of Music, Theatre & Dance, with a Bachelors (in 1997) and Masters (in 1998) of Music in Violin Performance, graduating with high honors.

Career
Inspired by the works of William Grant Still, Dworkin realized the lack of the minorities involved in classical music. He created the Sphinx Organization to help reflect the diversity in the United States in orchestras. He is the founder and former president of the Sphinx Organization.

He was a Member of the Obama National Arts Policy Committee.

He became dean of the University of Michigan School of Music, Theatre & Dance on July 20, 2015. On April 5, 2017, he announced his resignation as dean at the conclusion of the 2016–17 academic year in order to focus on family issues.

Awards
 2003 Michigan Governors Award for Arts & Culture
 2003 Michiganian of the Year, Detroit News
 2005 MacArthur Fellows Program
 2006 Newsweek Giving Back Award
 MLK Spirit Award
 2013 Honorary Member of the Royal Philharmonic Society

Discography
 Ebony Rhythm Ethnovibe
 Bar-Talk. Ethnovibe

References

Sources

External links
 
 "Raisin' the Buzz: At the table with Aaron Dworkin", innovate2uplift, January 28, 2009
 Aaron Dworkin interviewed on Conversations from Penn State

1970 births
21st-century American Jews
21st-century American male musicians
21st-century American violinists
American adoptees
American male violinists
Jewish American musicians
Living people
MacArthur Fellows
People from Monticello, New York
University of Michigan faculty
University of Michigan School of Music, Theatre & Dance alumni